Fcα/μR, also known as is CD351 (Cluster of Differentiation 351), is an Fc receptor that binds IgM with high affinity and IgA with a 10-fold lower affinity. In mice the receptor is expressed on macrophages, follicular dendritic cells, marginal zone B cells, follicular B cells, and kidney tubular epithelial cells. In humans expression has been described on intestinal lamina propria cells, Paneth cells, follicular dendritic cells in tonsils, activated macrophages and some types of pre-germinal centre IgD+/CD38+ B cells.

References

External links 
 

Fc receptors